In the Enchanted Garden is the debut album from American new-age pianist Kevin Kern. As with his succeeding albums, it is an album of instrumental songs. It was released on February 27, 1996.

Track listing
All compositions by Kevin Kern.

"Through the Arbor" – 3:45
"Sundial Dreams" – 4:46
"The Enchanted Garden" – 6:54
"Butterfly" – 2:52
"Straw Hats" – 4:14
"Another Realm" – 5:02
"Water Lilies" – 4:17
"Fairy Wings" – 4:30
"Paper Clouds" – 3:07
"After the Rain" – 4:10

Liner Notes
Graceful, articulate piano songs suffused with heart and rendered with an ultrarefined touch. These intimate, poetic melodies unfold tenderly, thoughtfully... some with a light layer of strings and touch of acoustic guitar, others speaking directly, without embellishment. Pure, beautiful, emotionally rich piano in a very special debut album from Real Music.

Personnel 
 Kevin Kern – piano, keyboards, Producer
 Jeff Linsky – guitar
 Terence Yallop – Executive Producer

References

External links 
 
 Kevin Kern at Real Music

In the Enchanted Garden
Kevin Kern albums